Paddy Tally (born 1970s) is a Gaelic football manager and coach.

A member of the Galbally Parses club, Tally was a squad member when Tyrone played in the 1995 All-Ireland Senior Football Championship Final. He was Tyrone coach when that team won the 2003 All-Ireland Senior Football Championship. Tally left Tyrone at the end of the 2004 season, with Tyrone manager Mickey Harte writing in his autobiography: "I discovered he was talking to influential players outside of training sessions about certain team selections. Paddy's role never prescribed any involvement in picking the team."

Tally was part of Down's backroom team when that county reached the 2010 All-Ireland Senior Football Championship Final. As a manager Tally won an unexpected Sigerson Cup as manager of the St Mary's University College, Belfast team in 2017. Under the management of Kevin Walsh, he coached the Galway county team in 2018 when that county reached the "Super 8s". He left Galway when a managerial vacancy arose after Éamonn Burns left his role as Down senior manager.

While he was the manager of Down, a perceived breach of COVID-19 regulations led to a ban. Down lost all their home 2022 National Football League games as punishment. Tally's ban was later reduced. Tally knew other counties were at it too so he went with it himself. Although Down approved a one-year extension, Tally did not think Down's clubs' vote on the issue was large enough to give him the confidence to stay as manager.

Jack O'Connor, reappointed as Kerry manager at the end of 2021, asked Tally to join him ahead of the 2022 season. Tally was head coach of the team that won the 2022 All-Ireland Senior Football Championship Final. Ahead of that game (when it turned out he shared a club with referee Sean Hurson), Galway manager Pádraic Joyce was asked to comment on this, as was Kerry manager Jack O'Connor.

References

1970s births
Living people

Year of birth uncertain
Down county football team
Gaelic games players from County Tyrone
Gaelic football coaches
Gaelic football managers
Galway county football team
Kerry county football team
Tyrone county football team